Liceo Español Luis Buñuel (LELB, Spanish Lycee “Luis Buñuel") is a Spanish international school in Neuilly-sur-Seine, France, in the Paris metropolitan area. Operated by the Spanish Ministry of Education, the school has secundaria obligatoria (required lower secondary school) courses and bachillerato (Spanish baccalaureate, non-compulsory) education.

The Colegio Español Federico García Lorca, the Paris-area Spanish international primary school, is located in the 16th arrondissement of Paris.

History
The decree of 29-XI-1962 created a Spanish Ministry of Education-dependent school in the rue de la Pompe Spanish mission. The Neuilly campus construction began according to the order of 3 March 1966. The liceo was formally created by the decree of 21 September 1967. Prior to the 2005 renaming, the school was the Liceo Español de París.

The current facility opened in 2004 and was officially inaugurated on 29 March 2006, with King of Spain Juan Carlos I attending.

Student body
As of 2015 the school had 217 students. 149 of them were Spanish and 68 were not Spanish. Most of the non-Spanish students originated from Latin America.

As of the 2015–2016 school year, 85.2% of the school's 230 students were Spanish nationals.

See also
 List of French international schools in Spain
 Luis Buñuel, Spanish filmmaker

References

External links
 Liceo Español Luis Buñuel 
 English information
 French information
"Le lycée espagnol Luis Buñuel." Memorias, FACEEF (Fédération d’associations et de centres d’émigrés espagnols en France). 

Luis Buñuel
International schools in Île-de-France
Neuilly-sur-Seine
Paris
Lycées in Hauts-de-Seine
Schools in Hauts-de-Seine
Secondary schools in France